The Skillings River is a  tidal river in Hancock County, Maine, flowing to Frenchman Bay. For most of its length it forms the boundary between the towns of Hancock and Lamoine.

See also
List of rivers of Maine

References

External links
USGS Geographic Names Information Service
Maine Streamflow Data from the USGS
Maine Watershed Data From Environmental Protection Agency
Emergency Rules encompassing said river

Rivers of Maine